Cheltenham station is a SEPTA Regional Rail station in Cheltenham, Pennsylvania. Located at Old Soldiers Road and Hasbrook Avenue, it serves the Fox Chase Line. The station has a 17-space parking lot. In FY 2013, Cheltenham station had a weekday average of 267 boardings and 392 alightings.

Until 2005, CSX's Trenton Subdivision freight line and the Fox Chase Line shared track from Newtown Junction to a point just south of Cheltenham station, where SEPTA trains utilized a crossover to travel to/from the freight track. These tracks are now segregated, with a siding having been installed between Cheltenham and Lawndale stations for SEPTA use during peak hours. Further north, the freight line eventually joins SEPTA's West Trenton Line between Neshaminy Falls and Langhorne although the tracks no longer connect, and outbound passengers must now cross the inbound track to exit the station.

Cheltenham station serves the Burholme neighborhood of Northeast Philadelphia and the eastern part of Cheltenham Township.

History
In 1993, the original 100-year-old station was destroyed by fire in what was ruled by the police as an arson. The station was replaced with a trailer serving as the ticket office. A new station and high-level platforms were opened in October 2007.

Station layout

References

External links 

Current schedule for the SEPTA Fox Chase/Newtown line
SEPTA station page for Cheltenham
Picture of the old station building
 Station House from Google Maps Street View

SEPTA Regional Rail stations
Former Reading Company stations
Railway stations in the United States opened in 1893
Buildings and structures in the United States destroyed by arson
Arson in Pennsylvania